Tetrakis may refer to:
Tetrakis (Paphlagonia), an ancient Greek city 
Tetrakis cuboctahedron, convex polyhedron with 32 triangular faces
Tetrakis hexahedron, an Archimedean dual solid or a Catalan solid
Tetrakis square tiling, a tiling of the Euclidean plane
Tetrakis(triphenylphosphine)palladium(0), a catalyst in organic chemistry

See also
Tetracus
Tetrakis legomenon, a word that occurs only four times within a context
Tetricus (disambiguation)
Tetrix (disambiguation)
Truncated tetrakis cube, a convex polyhedron with 32 faces